Tetrapora is a genus of flowering plants belonging to the family Myrtaceae.

Its native range is Southwestern Australia.

Species:

Tetrapora floribunda 
Tetrapora glomerata 
Tetrapora preissiana 
Tetrapora tenuiramea 
Tetrapora verrucosa

References

Myrtaceae
Myrtaceae genera